Mechelen Golden Sharks are a Belgian ice hockey team that plays in the BeNe League, the top tier of the sport in Belgium and the Netherlands. The team is based in Mechelen and play their home games at the Ice Skating Center Mechelen.

History
The Mechelen Golden Sharks began to play in 2016, initially in the Belgian 2nd division. There, they dominated the competition in their debut season, winning all but two of their games, ultimately finishing in the 1st place. The following season they returned, and were even more dominant, winning every game. Subsequently, they moved to the BeNe League. In their first season in the BeNe League the team signed Lithuanian international and former Nijmegen Devil Aivaras Bendžius, however, they struggled against the tougher competition, finishing 10th out of 12 teams. They would improve in their 2nd season in the league, finishing 8th and qualifying for the play-offs, which were ultimately cancelled due to the COVID-19 pandemic.

The Golden Sharks are the senior side representing the ColdPlay Sharks team. Meanwhile, a feeder team, the Future Golden Sharks plays in the Belgian 1st Division.

Roster 
Updated February 4, 2021.

Season-by-season record
Note: GP = Games played, W = Wins, L = Losses, T = Ties, OTL = Overtime losses, Pts = Points, GF = Goals for, GA = Goals against, PIM = Penalties in minutes

Team records

Career
These are the top five scorers in Golden Sharks history.

''Note: Pos = Position; GP = Games played; G = Goals; A = Assists; Pts = Points

Penalty minutes: Jakob Huyghe, 149

Season

Regular season 
 Most goals in a season: Martin Váchal, 102 (2017–18)
 Most assists in a season: Martin Váchal, 77 (2017–18)
 Most points in a season: Martin Váchal, 179 (2017–18)
 Most penalty minutes in a season: Jakob Huyghe, 90 (2018–19)

Notable players
 Aivaras Bendžius

References

External links
 Mechelen Golden Sharks 
 

 BeNe League (ice hockey) teams
Ice hockey teams in Belgium
Ice hockey clubs established in 2016
2016 establishments in Belgium
Sport in Mechelen